Hamilton was an electoral riding in Ontario, Canada. It was created in 1867 at the time of confederation. In 1894 it was split into two ridings called Hamilton East and Hamilton West.

Members of Provincial Parliament

References

Former provincial electoral districts of Ontario